Bohdan Myronovych Matkivskyi (born 14 February 1980) is a Ukrainian politician who served as a People's Deputy of Ukraine in the 8th Ukrainian Verkhovna Rada, representing Ukraine's 121st electoral district.

Early life and career
Matkivskyi graduated the 9th form in secondary school No. 3, then studied at the Heroes of Kruty Lviv Military Lyceum. He graduated from vocational training school No. 19 with honours, and graduated from the Ivan Franko State Pedagogical University's faculty of management and marketing, but did not pursue a pedagogical nor economic career. From 2008, Matkivskyi has been involved in social-economic programs, and he additionally was general director of Zet-Avtor PLC.

Political career 
During Euromaidan, Matkivskyi was a deputy of the 12th sotnia of the Maidan Self-Defence. In February 2014, Bohdan Matkivskyi was appointed a coordinator of self-defence in Drohobych by Andriy Parubiy. He is a commander of the 2nd section of the 2nd company command of the 1st battalion of Ukrainian National Army.

He is one of the founders of the  political party.

In 2014, he was elected as a People's Deputy of Ukraine from Ukraine's 121st electoral district, located in Lviv Oblast. He assumed office on 27 November 2014. He is an independent. He was secretary of the Verkhovna Rada Committee on the questions of economic policy, and a member of groups for inter-parliamentary cooperation with Norway, Finland, Vietnam, India, and China.

Honours and awards 
Ukraine's President's Honour — anniversary medal «25 Years of Ukraine’s Independence» (2016).

References 

 Verkhovna Rada of Ukraine, official web portal

1980 births
Living people
People from Truskavets
Seventh convocation members of the Verkhovna Rada
Eighth convocation members of the Verkhovna Rada